The 5th Kazakhstan President Cup was played from April 28 to May 2, 2012 in Almaty. 8 youth teams participated in the tournament (players were born no earlier than 1996.)

Participants

Venues 
The match of the final took place at the Central Stadium. Other matches took place at Football Land.

Format 
The tournament is held in two stages. At the first stage, eight teams are divided into two qualification groups (A and B). Competitions of the first stage were held on circular system. The winners of the groups advance to the final, while the group runners-up meet to determine third place.

Group stage
All times UTC+6

Group A

Group B

Match for the 7th place

Match for the 5th place

Bronze medal match

Final

Statistics

Goalscorers 

6 goals

  Ali Rigi

2 goals

  Fahmin Muradbeyli
  Luka Zarandia
  Donát Zsótér
  Márk Koszta
  Majid Hosseini
  Saeid Ezatollahi
  Reza Qurmollaçab
  Rifat Nurmukhamet
  Didar Zhalmukan
  Gökhan Göksu
  Furkan Narin
  Arslan Agabaýew
  Ilýas Rozýýew

1 goal

  Orbeli Ambartsumian
  Alik Arakelyan
  Aram Sargsyan
  Eduard Avakian
  Mikael Hashimyan
  Elnur Jafarov
  Mahir Madatov
  Zurab Malania
  Nika Lashkhia
  Attila Talaber
  Milan Bölcsföldi
  Bence Grabant
  Bartosz
  Ali Hazzami
  Sasan Jafari
  Islam Iminov
  Ruslan Sakhibov
  Mujahit Çakir
  Meýlis Hýdýrow

Prize money 
According to FFK, the prize fund of a tournament will make 20,000 $. "The teams which took 1, 2 and 3 place will be received, respectively 10,000, 6,000 and 4,000 $.

References 

2012
2012 in Kazakhstani football
2012 in youth association football